This is a list of schools in Port Moresby, the capital of Papua New Guinea.

Papua New Guinea's education system is divided into two sections: the international school system, which is administered by the International Education Agency and offers a standard of education based on Australian or British school systems or the International Baccalaureate; and the national school system, which consists of elementary (K–2), primary (3–8) and secondary (9–12) schools. Competitive examinations are held in year 10 for entry into the country's four national high schools, of which one is located in Port Moresby.

Port Moresby is internally divided into wards or town areas. They are:

 Town/Hanuabada — along the west coast, including the CBD
 Tokarara/Hohola — northeast of the CBD
 Kila Kila/Kaugere — along the south coast
 Boroko/Korobosea — centred on Boroko east of the CBD
 Gordons/Saraga — eastern suburbs, north of Boroko
 Waigani/University — northern suburbs
 Gerehu — outer northern suburbs
 Bomana — north-eastern townships beyond the metropolitan area

Elementary and primary schools

Secondary schools

Vocational centres

International schools

See also

 List of schools in Papua New Guinea

Schools, Port Moresby